A basket is a wicker container used for transporting many things from small animals to food products.

Basket or baskets may also refer to:

Baskets, the two back seats facing one another on the outside of a stagecoach
Basket (finance), an economic term for a collection of securities aggregated into a single product to allow for simultaneous trading
Baskets (TV series), an American television series on FX
Market basket, an economic term for a collection of goods for tracking their price
Basket Dome, a mountain in California
Breadbasket, a region of country which produces an agricultural surplus which is considered vital for the country as a whole
BasKet Note Pads, a note taking piece of software; part of the KDE environment
Three baskets, the Pali canon of Buddhist texts

Sport
 Basket (basketball), basketball goal structure
 Basket (disc golf), most common type of disc golf target
 Brose Baskets, a former name of Brose Bamberg, a professional basketball club based in Bamberg, Germany
 Düsseldorf Baskets, a professional basketball club based in Düsseldorf, Germany
 ETB Wohnbau Baskets, a professional basketball club based in Essen, Germany
 Paderborn Baskets, a professional basketball club based in Paderborn, Germany
 SCH Würzburg Baskets and s. Oliver Baskets, former names of s.Oliver Würzburg, a professional basketball club based in Würzburg, Germany
 Telekom Baskets Bonn, a professional basketball club based in Bonn, Germany

See also

Baskett, a surname
Baskette, a surname